Pulikkal  or Cherukavu is a village in Malappuram district in the state of Kerala, India.

Proposed Karipur-Kondotty Municipality 
The proposed Karipur-Kondotty Municipality comprises:
Kondotty panchayat (villages of Kondotty, and part of Karipur)
Nediyiruppu panchayat (villages of Nediyiruppu, and part of Karipur)
Pallikkal panchayat (villages of Pallikkal, and part of Karipur)
Pulikkal panchayat
Cherukavu panchayat
Vazhayur panchayat

Total Area: 122.99 km2

Total Population (1991 Census): 152,839

Demographics
 India census, Pulikkal had a population of 35050 with 17481 males and 17569 females.

Cherukavu Panchayath
Most parts of Pulikkal town fall under the jurisdiction of Cherukavu Panchayath administration.  The word Pulikkal is used to refer to the town and the word Cherukavu is used only by the bureaucracy.  The actual center of Cherukavu village is in Kannamvettikkavu, five kilometers away from Pulikkal town.

Currencyless Village
In 2016, Pulikkal was declared as one of the eight currency less villages of Kerala because of the complete acceptance of e-wallet, e-commerce and debit card based transactions.  The government is giving training to the village people for using online financial transactions. The drive was especially significant in wake of the Government of India demonetization drive of 2016.

Suburbs and Villages
 Valiyaparamba
 Siyamkandam
 Periyambalam
 Andiyoorkunnu
 Alungal and Kottappuram
 Thalekkara and Neettanimmal

Transportation
Pulikkal village connects to other parts of India through Feroke town on the west and Nilambur town on the east.  National highway No.66 passes through Pulikkal and the northern stretch connects to Goa and Mumbai.  The southern stretch connects to Cochin and Trivandrum.  State Highway No.28 starts from Nilambur and connects to Ooty, Mysore and Bangalore through Highways.12,29 and 181. The nearest airport is at Kozhikode.  The nearest major railway station is at Feroke.

References

   Villages in Malappuram district
Kondotty area